The Cornell Big Red represented Cornell University in ECAC women's ice hockey during the 2014–15 NCAA Division I women's ice hockey season. The Big Red advanced to the ECAC Championship game until being stopped by Harvard.

Offseason

One former and six current Cornell players were invited to try out for Team Canada in Fall Festival Tryouts.

Recruiting

2014–15 Big Red

Schedule

|-
!colspan=12 style=""| Regular Season

|-
!colspan=12 style=""| ECAC Tournament

Awards and honors
Brianne Jenner (48 points) and Emily Fulton (47 points) are #8 and #9 of top national points leaders
Brianne Jenner, ECAC Player of the Year
Brianne Jenner, Patty Kazmaier Award Finalist
Brianne Jenner, F, All-ECAC First Team
Jillian Saulnier, F, All-ECAC First Team
Erin O'Connor, D, All-ECAC Second Team

Emily Fulton, F, All-ECAC Second Team

Erin O'Connor, D, All-ECAC Rookie Team

References

Cornell
Cornell Big Red women's ice hockey seasons
Cornell
Cornell